Diana Morant Ripoll (born 25 June 1980) is a Spanish politician who has been Minister of Science and Innovation since 12 July 2021. She has been Secretary-General of the Socialist Party of the Valencian Country since 2014 and Mayor of Gandia (Valencia) from June 2015 until July 2021. She was also member of the Corts Valencianes, the regional assembly of the Valencia region, from July 2015 to May 2017. She started her political career in the Spanish Socialist Workers Party (PSOE) on 11 June 2011.

Life 
Diana Morant was born in Gandia, Spain on 25 June 1980, the older of two sisters. She studied Basic General Education (EGB) at the Abat Solà de Gandia school and, later, she attended the Unified Polyvalent Baccalaureate (BUP) and the University Orientation Course (COU) at the María Enríquez de Gandia Institute. She studied Telecommunications Engineering at the Technical University of Valencia, graduating in 2007.

After several years working as an engineer, in February 2011, she was invited by the then Mayor of Gandia, José Manuel Orengo Pastor, to be part of the candidacy of the PSPV-PSOE of Gandia in the 2011 Spanish local elections. In her candidacy, she was ranked number 5 on the electoral list. In those elections, the PSPV-PSOE obtained 10 councillors; she was named councillor of the City of Gandia on 11 June 2011. During the legislature from 2011 to 2015, she was a councillor in the opposition.

In May 2014, José Manuel Orengo, then Secretary-General of PSPV-PSOE de Gandia, announced that he was taking a step back and resigning as the party's secretary-general. Diana Morant, then Secretary of Organization, announced her candidacy to lead the party in Gandia. In June 2014 she was elected Secretary-General of the Gandia socialists.

In October 2014, Diana Morant presented her candidacy for the primary process that the PSPV launched to elect its candidates for mayors. She was unopposed, so she was proclaimed PSPV-PSOE candidate to the mayor of Gandia for the 2015 Spanish local elections.

In the municipal elections of 2015, the PP won 12 councillors, the PSPV-PSOE 7, the coalition Més Gandia 5 and Citizens 1. Three weeks later, on 13 June 2015, at the plenary session, Diana Morant obtained the support of the councillors of the PSPV-PSOE, Més Gandia and the mayor of Ciudadanos, thus achieving the mayor's office of Gandia ending four years of government in absolute majority of the PP. She resigned on 11 July 2021 after being nominated Science Minister by prime minister Pedro Sánchez.

References

External links
 

1980 births
Living people
Women mayors of places in Spain
People from Gandia
Members of the Corts Valencianes
Mayors of places in the Valencian Community
Socialist Party of the Valencian Country politicians
Spanish women engineers
Technical University of Valencia alumni
Women legislators in Spain
21st-century Spanish engineers
21st-century Spanish politicians
21st-century Spanish women politicians
21st-century women engineers